Arvaikheer Airport  is a public airport located in Arvaikheer, the capital of Övörkhangai Province in Mongolia. The official name in accordance with Mongolian AIP is UVURKHANGAI/Arvaikheer (Aug 2022).

See also 

 List of airports in Mongolia
 List of airlines of Mongolia

References

External links
 world airport codes

Airports in Mongolia